Folke Pettersson was a male Swedish international table tennis player.

Table tennis career
He won a silver medal at the 1930 World Table Tennis Championships in the men's team event.

See also
 List of table tennis players
 List of World Table Tennis Championships medalists

References

Swedish male table tennis players
World Table Tennis Championships medalists